MCCDC may refer to:

 Marine Corps Combat Development Command, training facility at Marine Corps Base Quantico
 Metropolitan Community Church of Washington, D.C., LGBT church in Washington, D.C.